The 2017–18 Thai FA Futsal Cup was the sixth season of Thailand's knockout futsal competition. It was sponsored by Advanced Info Service (AIS), and was known as the AIS FA Futsal Cup for sponsorship purposes. The tournament was organized by the Football Association of Thailand. 61 clubs were accepted into the tournament. It began with a qualification round from 6 October to 17 October 2017, and concluded with the final round from 25 November 2017 to 7 January 2018.

Calendar

Results

Qualification round

First round

Round of 16

Quarter-finals

Semi-finals

Final

Awards

References 

Futsal competitions in Thailand
2017 in Asian futsal
2018 in Asian futsal